The 1737 Calcutta cyclone, also known as the Hooghly River cyclone of 1737 or the Great Bengal cyclone of 1737, was the first super cyclone on record in North Indian Ocean regarded one of the worst natural disasters in India.  It hit the coast near Kolkata on the morning of 11 October 1737 and presumably killed over 300,000 people inland and sea, and caused widespread catastrophic damage. The cyclone hit land over the Ganges River Delta, just southwest of Calcutta. Most deaths resulted from storm the surge and happened on the sea: many ships sank in the Bay of Bengal and an unknown number of livestock and wild animals were killed from the effects of the cyclone. The damage was described as "extensive" but numerical statistics are unknown.

Meteorological history 
The cyclone presumably moved northwest before turning northward, paralleling the coast of Calcutta between 10 and 11 October. The storm then began to slow down before turning north-northeastwards, making landfall over the Ganges River Delta, just south of Calcutta. It slowed down while crossing the West Bengal, entering modern-day Bangladesh on or by 13 October before being last noted that day, far to the north of Dacca.

The track 
 
India Meteorological Department researchers conducted a study about the storm's track, finding similar storms that passed on or near Calcutta to cause similar damage and the same date when they passed. The 1864 Calcutta cyclone is an example they used, as the storm also had caused similar aftermath to the area nearly 127 years before. The full brunt of the 1864 storm was felt at Calcutta from 10:00 pm to 4:00 am (IST) on 4 and 5 October (14:30 pm to 20:30 pm, UTC). Meanwhile, the storm started to brush the coast of the area on "the night of October 11 and 12", presumably between the same time as the 1864 storm but using the date of the 1737 storm. Researchers then adjusted the landfall time of the 1737 storm to match the time where the residents inland experienced the storm's fury.

Impact 
The cyclone is regarded as one of India's worst natural disasters since reliable statistics began to be recorded.

Rain accumulation on the Ganges was estimated at 381 mm (15 in) over six hours. In his official report, Thomas Joshua Moore, the British East India Company duties collector, said that almost all the thatched buildings had been destroyed by the storm and flood. An estimated 3,000 inhabitants of the town have been killed. An earthquake and a storm surge, destroying some 20,000 ships in the harbor and killing some 300,000 people, were reported by other merchant ships.

Golgotta, a port by the Americans in Calcutta, reported significant destruction. Houses near or on the harbor were destroyed and the local St. Anne's Church sustained substantial damage and subsequently collapsed. Over 20,000 ships, barks, sloops, boats, canoes and other marine infrastructures were destroyed and washed out, respectively. Many cattle, tigers, and rhinoceroses were drowned in a storm surge with an estimated height of 10–13 meters (or 30–40 feet) from the storm and the "earthquake". Many crocodiles were also stifled by the strong river currents, and birds were plunged into the river by the winds, drowning them. Two 500-ton ships were thrown by large waves into a populated village, which further broke into pieces. Many people and cattle were killed. Two more ships of 60 tons were wrecked and found over the high grounds, destroying large trees. Eight out of nine ships were lost in the Ganges River and most of their crews drowned in the high seas. Three out of four Dutch ships also sank in the Ganges River and Bay of Bengal, respectively. The spire of the Govindaram temple was also destroyed by the cyclone.

The damages were described as "extensive", but no numerical data was recorded. Deaths were estimated at 300,000 individuals according to some books; however, Calcutta's population of Calcutta was less than 20,000 based on estimates and counting of 10,000 to 12,000 between 1705 and 1720, respectively. Although there would appear to be little evidence for the widely reported figure of 300,000 deaths or for an earthquake at all, this number shows up recurrently in popular literature. At the same time, the figure of 3,000 is only an estimation of the number of deaths inside the city itself.

In the aftermath of Cyclone Amphan on Kolkata, many people, including Chief Minister of West Bengal Mamata Banerjee compared the catastrophe of the storm to this cyclone due to its similar effects and impact.

See also 

1864 Calcutta cyclone - a deadly tropical cyclone that devastated the same area nearly 130 years after.
1970 Bhola cyclone - the deadliest tropical cyclone worldwide.

References

External links 
 The 1737 Calcutta Earthquake and Cyclone Evaluated by  Roger Bilham, BSSA, Vol. 84, No. 5, October 1994
 Cyclone-Related Disasters on India 
 

The report on the 1737 Earthquake

18th century in Kolkata
1737 in India
Tropical cyclones in India
Bay of Bengal